UDD may refer to:

Science and technology
Ultra-dense deuterium
Neutrons, which have quark configurations of udd, or up-down-down
Ultradisperse diamond, another name for Detonation nanodiamond
Urine-diversion dehydration toilet
User driven development

Others
Uniform Distribution of Deaths, an assumption used in building actuarial life tables
Bermuda Dunes Airport
UDD, the station code for the Uddingston railway station in Uddingston, Scotland
United Front for Democracy Against Dictatorship, a political movement in Thailand
Universidad del Desarrollo private university in Chile
Up dharma Down, a Filipino band